Brown coat may refer to:
 the brown coat, a layer (typically the second of three) of stucco
 Browncoat, a fan of the American space western science fiction drama television series Firefly, which aired 11 episodes in 2002